William Henry Herndon (December 25, 1818 – March 18, 1891) was a law partner and biographer of President Abraham Lincoln. He was an early member of the new Republican Party and was elected mayor of Springfield, Illinois.

Early life

Herndon was born the first child of Archer G. Herndon (1795–1867) and his wife, on December 25, 1818, in Greensburg, Kentucky. The family moved to Illinois in 1820. Another child was born to Archer and his wife in Macon County, Illinois. By the spring of 1821 the family was living in Sangamon County. When William was five, the family settled in the German Prairie settlement located five miles northeast of Springfield. Two more children were born to the family there.

Herndon's father built the first tavern in Springfield and was engaged in other forms of mercantile business from 1825 to 1836. He was also involved in politics as state senator, and was one of the men instrumental in having the state capital moved to Springfield.

William, known as "Billy" at the time, worked for his father at the Indian Queen hotel before he attended college. It was one of the first hotels in Springfield.

Marriage and children
On March 26, 1840, Herndon married Mary J. Maxcy in Sangamon County. Mary's family were also early Illinois settlers; her grandfather and step-grandmother arrived in 1827 and Mary's immediate family arrived in 1834. Mary was born in Kentucky on July 27, 1822, to Maria Cook Maxcy and James Maxcy, a veteran of the War of 1812. James' father, Revolutionary War veteran Joel Maxcy, arrived in Sangamon County in 1827 with his second wife and died the following month.

Mary and William had six children: James, Annie, Beverly, Elizabeth, Leigh and Mary. Mary Herndon died on August 18, 1860. The following summer, on July 31, 1861, Herndon married Anna Miles with whom he had three more children: Nina Belle, William and Minnie. The family moved to a farm in Fancy Creek Township located six miles north of Springfield.

Education and career
Herndon attended Illinois College from 1836 to 1837 in Jacksonville, Illinois, but he had "an unsuccessful year". Following this, he returned to Springfield and clerked at the Joshua Speed store, where he often engaged in debates, discussions, and poetry readings with Abraham Lincoln. Their conversations and readings were sometimes practice sessions before presenting material to the Young Men's Lyceum, where both Herndon and Lincoln were members. It was an organization of aspiring young men.

In 1840 Herndon began studying law at the Logan and Lincoln law practice. Although employed at Joshua Speed's store, he studied up to 14 hours per day after work.

In November 1844, Herndon passed the bar examination. In 1854, ten years after beginning his partnership with Lincoln, he was elected mayor of Springfield, Illinois. Both men were members of the Whig Party. In 1856 Herndon was one of the organizers of the fledgling Republican Party after the dissolution of the Whigs. Lincoln also joined the Republican Party, hoping to "fuse" people of disparate political affiliations who wanted to end slavery.

Herndon loved to learn and developed "one of the best private libraries in Springfield" including works by historians, economists, humanists, free-thinkers and philosophers.

Herndon enjoyed a comfortable lifestyle well into middle age due to the successful law firm and his various elected and appointed offices. After the Civil War he suffered severe financial reversals due to bad investments, bank failures, excessive generosity to relatives and friends, and his inability to economize when his income declined sharply. By 1869, he was destitute and facing foreclosure on his home.

Abraham Lincoln

Partnership
In the fall of 1844, Lincoln was tired of being a junior partner. He had worked for senior partners with political ambitions, and Lincoln wanted a younger partner to whom he could relate. Surprising both his wife and Herndon, in October Lincoln invited his friend to form a partnership. Lincoln appreciated Herndon's friendship, loyalty, shared political beliefs and conscientious study. Lincoln said that Herndon "was my man always above all other men on the globe." Herndon did not disappoint his friend. He contributed to the practice by performing research for his older and more experienced partner, building the firm's law library, and overseeing young men who came to study law (read the law) at their office.

Politics
Herndon was a much stauncher opponent of slavery than Lincoln and claimed that he helped change Lincoln's views on the subject.  He felt that President Lincoln acted too slowly to bring an end to slavery. Herndon felt that the only way to rid the country of slavery was "through bloody revolution."

During political campaigns Herndon made strong points that tended to alienate members of the Republican Party and swing voters. Thus, for the 1860 presidential campaign, Herndon was not involved in direct political activities. However, he executed an important task during that campaign by conducting opposition research in the Illinois State Library to be used against Stephen A. Douglas in the 1860 presidential race. Finally, when Lincoln balked at voting for himself, Herndon persuaded him to do so.

Relationship with the Lincoln family
Through the whole of his partnership and friendship with Lincoln he was never invited to Lincoln's home for dinner due to his contentious relationship with Mary Todd Lincoln. He also admitted that his frustration with Lincoln's overly permissive parenting of his two younger sons, Willie and Tad, whom he recalled as undisciplined and disruptive brats in the law offices, caused some harsh words during their partnership.

His final meeting with Lincoln occurred in 1862 when he visited Washington, D.C. Lincoln received him amicably, but he was not invited into the family's private quarters in the White House due to the enmity of Mary Lincoln.

Biography

Initial research
Following Lincoln's assassination, Herndon began to collect stories of Lincoln's life from those who knew him. Herndon aspired to write a faithful portrait of his friend and law partner, based on his own observations and on hundreds of letters and interviews he had compiled for the purpose. He was determined to present Lincoln as a man, rather than a saint, and to reveal things that the prevailing Victorian era conventions said should be left out of the biography of a great national hero.

In particular, Herndon said of Lincoln's "official" biographers, John Nicolay and John Hay: "They are aiming, first, to do a superb piece of literary work; second, to make the story with the classes as against the masses." He felt that this would represent the "real Lincoln about as well as does a wax figure in the museum."

Shared research information
Ward Hill Lamon, who was then collaborating with a ghostwriter on a Lincoln biography, approached him for assistance. Herndon provided copies of and access to his original correspondences with Lincoln acquaintances and a written agreement not to publish his own biography of Lincoln for at least ten years in exchange for $2,000 cash and an agreement to receive up to $2,000 of the book's royalties.

Collaboration with Jesse Weik

By the time he was free to release his own biography of Lincoln, a miscellany of personal problems, including continued financial problems and his alcoholism, left him unable to formulate the stacks of papers into a coherent text.

A young man named Jesse W. Weik who had corresponded with Herndon became a good friend. They then collaborated on the biography of Lincoln's life. Weik performed additional research in the 1880s, picking up any new information since Herndon's original research, and rewrote much of Herndon's draft.

The collaboration between the two men was often contentious due to extreme creative differences in writing style and in their visions of what type of biography should result; Weik favored a narrative linear form while Herndon wanted essentially a loosely connected volume of reminiscences grouped by type such as  domestic life, law practice, political philosophy, etc. However, the two persisted due to a recognition of their complete dependence on each other. Weik depended on Herndon for the source materials and first person accounts of Lincoln, and Herndon on Weik for the energy of creating the manuscript and increasingly for financial support, which guaranteed their continued relationship.

Herndon's Lincoln: The True Story of a Great Life, the result of their collaborations, appeared in a three-volume edition published by Belford, Clarke & Company in 1889.  The majority of the actual writing was done by Weik, who received full credit as co-author. The book received mixed reviews due to the inclusion of such unvarnished elements as Lincoln's mother's illegitimacy (and even the rumors of Lincoln's own), its sometimes viciously negative portrayal of Herndon's longtime enemy Mary Todd Lincoln, Abraham Lincoln's suicidal depression, and other decidedly less-than-hagiographic accounts of the martyred president who was quickly becoming the most venerated and romanticized figure in American history.

Weik kept the notes gathered during the writing of the book and wrote a follow-up book The Real Lincoln: A Portrait, which included Weik's personal insights and some embarrassing details for Herndon. Weik's family kept them for fifty more years.

Reception
Particularly damning was the denunciation of the book by Robert Todd Lincoln, whose grudge against Herndon stemmed largely from Herndon's recounting of Ann Rutledge as the only romantic love of his father's life. Weik felt that Herndon's portrayal of Robert's mother and the Lincoln's domestic life was especially hurtful.

Questionable business practices and financial reversals on the part of the book's publishers, combined with the book's poor initial sales, made the royalties of its two authors very meager, with most of Herndon's share going to repay the frequent small loans advanced to him by Weik.

Death
Herndon died March 18, 1891, at his farm north of Springfield. He is buried in Oak Ridge Cemetery in Springfield, the same cemetery as the Lincoln Tomb.

Herndon's son William, or Willie, died the same day as his father. Herndon died of la grippe (influenza) and his son Willie had la grippe that turned into pneumonia. At that time, William H., his wife Anna, Willie M. and their daughters Nina and Millie were at home. Herndon's wife Anna died less than two years later.

Portrayal
He was portrayed by
Jason Robards, Sr. in the 1930 film Abraham Lincoln
Alan Baxter in the 1940 biographical film Abe Lincoln in Illinois
Jeffrey DeMunn in the 1988 (TV mini-series) Lincoln 
Keith Carradine in the 1992 movie Lincoln
Michael Maize in the 2013 film Saving Lincoln
Bob Gunton in the 2017 film The Gettysburg Address
Herndon was portrayed in many films for decades.

See also
Abraham Lincoln's patent

Notes

References

Further reading
David Herbert Donald, Lincoln's Herndon (1948) the standard scholarly biography online
R. Vincent Enlow, "The Abraham Lincoln Genesis Cover-up: The Censored Origins of an Illustrious Ancestor," relating Herndon's accounts
 Roy P. Basler, ed. (1953) Collected Works of Abraham Lincoln, including the 15 February 1848 letter from Lincoln to Herndon. 
 
Letters:
(1) William H. Herndon to Jesse W. Weik, Jan. 16, 1886, Herndon-Weik Collection, Library of Congress
(2) Mary Todd Lincoln to David Davis, Mar. 6, [1867], "Mary Todd Lincoln: Her Life and Letters," ed. Justin G. Turner and Linda Leavitt Turner (1972)

External links

 
 
 
 

Abraham Lincoln in Springfield, Illinois
People from Greensburg, Kentucky
People from Springfield, Illinois
1818 births
1891 deaths
American biographers
American male biographers
Illinois Whigs
19th-century American politicians
Illinois Republicans
Mayors of Springfield, Illinois
Illinois lawyers
Deaths from the 1889–1890 flu pandemic
Historians of Abraham Lincoln
Burials at Oak Ridge Cemetery